The 19th Annual Gardel Awards ceremony were held on June 6, 2017. The TN network broadcast the show live from the Gran Rex Theatre in Buenos Aires. The ceremony recognizes the best recordings, compositions, and artists of the eligibility year, which runs from January 1, 2016 to January 31, 2016.

Lalo Mir and Maju Lozano hosted the ceremony. The "pre-telecast" ceremony was held on the same day at the Opera Allianz Theatre prior to the main event and was hosted by Gabriela Radice.

The nominations were announced on May 9, 2017 at the Néstor Kirchner Cultural Centre. Abel Pintos acquired the most nominations with five, while Carajo, Eruca Sativa and Illya Kuryaki and the Valderramas followed with three nominations each. Pintos was the biggest winner of the night with three trophies, including Best Male Pop Album the Golden Gardel Award for Album of the Year for 11, and Song of the Year for "Cómo Te Extraño". Eruca Sativa, Carajo and Babasónicos followed with two trophies each. The Solidarity Gardel Award went to León Gieco, for the video of his song "La memoria", which pays tribute to the victims at the AMIA bombing attack.

Background
The 2017 edition of the Gardel Awards received 1,500 applications, marking a 23% of increase regarding the 2016 edition, even though Universal, one of the major record companies, declined to submit its artists for award consideration. The genre that received the most nominations was rock, followed by folklore and pop.

Performers
Performers adapted from Clarín.com.

Nominees and winners
Nominees were taken from the Gardel Awards website. Winners are listed in bold.

General
Album of the Year
 11 – Abel Pintos
 3001 Proyecto Piazzolla – Elena Roger & Escalandrum
 Naranja persa – Ciro y los Persas

Song of the Year
 "Cómo Te Extraño" – Abel Pintos
 "La noche" – Andrés Calamaro
 "Armas gemelas" – Eruca Sativa
 "Soy" – Lali
 "La Tormenta" – Los Fabulosos Cadillacs

Best Singer-Songwriter Album
 Auténtico – Alejandro Lerner
 César Isella 60 - Todas las voces todas – César Isella
 Canta Mateo y Darnauchans – Fernando Cabrera
 Perdido por Perdido – Iván Noble
 Mis Américas, Vol. 1/2 – Kevin Johansen + The Nada

Pop
Best Female Pop Album
 Espinas & Pétalos – Marcela Morelo
 Piel – Déborah De Corral
 Soy – Lali

Best Male Pop Album
 11 – Abel Pintos
 Vida Lejana – Benjamín Amadeo
 Last Call – Maxi Trusso

Best Pop Group Album
 Las antenas – Estelares
 Era Es Será – Barco
 Ojos tremendos – Los Tipitos

Best New Pop Artist Album
 Vida Lejana – Benjamín Amadeo
 Antihéroe – Juanjo Ceccón
 Continental – Sullivan

Rock
Best Female Rock Album
 Sexo Con Modelos – Marilina Bertoldi
 Se vuelve cada día más loca por amor al blues – Celeste Carballo
 Señales – Patricia Sosa

Best Male Rock Album
 Encuentro Supremo – David Lebón
 Naranja persa – Ciro y los Persas
 Contraluz – Pedro Aznar

Best Rock Group Album
 Barro y Fauna – Eruca Sativa
 La Salvación de Solo y Juan – Los Fabulosos Cadillacs
 Vivo en Red House – Manal

Best New Rock Artist Album
 Al Borde del Filo – Las Diferencias
 Hoy – Mel Cruz
 Dedos Negros – Sol Bassa

Best Hard Rock/Punk Album
 Hoy Como Ayer – Carajo
 Vivo en Red House – A.N.I.M.A.L.
 1000 Vidas – Coverheads

Tango
Best Female Tango Album
 En Vivo en el Teatro Coliseo – Lidia Borda
 Memorias de un bandoneón – Carla Algeri
 Tango – Marián Farías Gómez

Best Male Tango Album
 Gardel Sinfónico – Ariel Ardit & Filarmónica de Medellín
 Secretos conocidos – Aquiles Roggero
 Misteriosa Buenos Aires – Osvaldo Piro y su Orquesta

Best New Tango Artist Album
 Así – Jorge Vázquez
 Tango Energy – Giannina Giunta
 La Martino Orquesta Típica – La Martino Orquesta Típica

Tropical
Best Female Tropical Album
 Cosecharás tu siembra – Gladys, la Bomba Tucumana
 Viva – Ángela Leiva
 No Ha Sido Fácil – Eugenia Quevedo

Best Male Tropical Album
 Sola Otra Bez – El Polaco
 Y Amigos – Daniel Cardozo
 Cumbia Peposa – El Pepo

Best Tropical Group Album
 Tiempo de bailar – Los Palmeras
 Todo Comenzó Bailando – Márama
 Una cerveza – Ráfaga

Best New Tropical Artist Album
 No Ha Sido Fácil – Eugenia Quevedo
 La Dama del Acordeón – Azul
 Sin Fronteras – Puli Moreno

Folk
Best Female Folklore Album
 Soledad 20 Años – Soledad
 Atar – Laura Ros
 Imposible – Liliana Herrero

Best Male Folklore Album
 El disco de oro. Folklore de 1940 – Vitillo Ábalos
 El Derecho De Vivir En paz – Bruno Arias
 De Criollo a Criollo, Homenaje a Don Ata (Mi Versión) – Chaqueño Palavecino

Best Folklore Group Album
 Solo Luz, Tributo a Raúl Carnota – Luna Monti y Juan Quintero
 Los Manseros Santiagueños en el Luna Park – Los Manseros Santiagueños
 30 Años – Los Nocheros

Cuarteto
Best Cuarteto Album
 No Me Pidan Que Baje el Volumen – Ulises Bueno
 Soy un tipo de la noche – La Mona Jiménez
 La gente me quiere – Jean Carlos

Best Cuarteto Group Album
 22 Años – La Barra
 Una Buena Costumbre – La Barra
 Raza Única – Tru-la-lá

Alternative
Best Alternative Tango Album
 Anda – Melingo
 La Pampa grande – La Chicana
 Desenchufado – Tanghetto

Best Alternative Folklore Album
 Otras Músicas – Chango Spasiuk
 Ayer es siempre – Juan Falú y Marcelo Moguilevsky
 Gira – Los Huayra

Best Alternative Rock/Pop Album
 L.H.O.N. – Illya Kuryaki and the Valderramas
 Mini Buda – Octafonic
 La Promesa de Thamar – Sig Ragga

Electronic
Best Electronic Music Album
 Opera Galaxy – Shoot the Radio
 DJ Sings The Blues – Dr. Trincado
 Circus – Mistol Team
 We Are Landscapes – Moon Pollen

Romantic/Melodic
Best Romantic/Melodic Album
 Clásico – Sergio Denis
 Aniversario – Jorge Rojas
 Amántico – Mike Amigorena

Music for Visual Media
Best Ciema/Television Soundtrack Album
 Otras Músicas – Chango Spasiuk
 Bandas de Sonido II – Diego Mizrahi
 Gilda, No Me Arrepiento de Este Amor – Natalia Oreiro

Reggae/Urban
Best Reggae/Urban Album
 Soundamérica – Los Pericos
 10 años – Dread Mar I
 Stay Rude! – Hugo Lobo
 Alas canciones – Los Cafres

Chamamé
Best Chamamé Album
 Puertos – Hernán Crespo
 En tiempo de Chamamé – Gabriel Cocomarola
 Ídolos – Juancito Güenaga y su conjunto

Jazz 
Best Jazz Album
 Mute – Fernández 4
 Música anfibia – Abel Rogantini
 Woody & Jazz – Manuel Fraga Trío

Classical
Best Classical Album
 Live – Sol Gabetta
 Ginastera - Prokofiev - Janácek, Manos a las Obras II – Elías Gurevich and Haydée Schvartz
 Senanes/Cuerdas Camerata Bariloche and Orquesta Cuerda

Best Instrumental Tango Orchestra Album
 Timba – Diego Schissi Quinteto
 13 – Rodolfo Mederos
 Aeropuerto París – Walter Ríos

World Music
Best Instrumental/Fusion/World Music Album
 El Tren - Solo Guitarra – Luis Salinas
 Qhapaq Ñan – Gustavo Santaolalla
 Punto de fuga – Nicolás Guerschberg

Children
Best Children's Album
 Churo! – Mariana Baraj
 Lo que Llevas en tu Corazón – Diego Topa and others
 Piñón en Familia – Piñón Fijo with Solcito Fijo and Jere Fijo

Historical
Best Catalog Colelction
 Héctor Stamponi interpreta su música al piano – Héctor Stamponi
 Fundamentales (81-87) "¿Y ahora qué pasa eh?" – Los Violadores
 Cinco Décadas de Rock Argentino: Primera Década (1966-1976) – Various Artists

Recording Engineering
Recording Engineering
 Hoy Como Ayer – Carajo
 Engineer: Alejandro Vazquez
 11 – Abel Pintos
 Engineers: Bori Alarcón – Iván Chapo – Antonio Pérez – Oskar Winberg – Edward Hartwell and Ted Jensen
 Brindando por Nada – Las Pelotas
 Engineers: Mariano Bilinkis – Uriel Mackren and Daniel Ovie

Producer
Production of the Year
 Barro y Fauna – Eruca Sativa
 Producer: Adrian Sosa
 11 – Abel Pintos
 Producers: Martin Terefe, Leiva, Abel Pintos and Ariel Pintos
 L.H.O.N. – Illya Kuryaki and the Valderramas
 Producers: Dante Spinetta and Emmanuel Horvilleur

Music Video/Film
Best DVD
 Desde Adentro - Impuesto de Fe – Babasónicos
 La Beriso (Estadio Único) – La Beriso
 Vivo en Red House – Manal

Best Music Video
 "En un bosque de la China" – Daniel Melingo
 "Pájaro Cantor"" – Abel Pintos
 "Gallo Negro" – Illya Kuryaki and the Valderramas

Design
Best Sleeve Design
 Impuesto de Fe – Babasónicos
 Designer: Alejandro Ros
 11 – Abel Pintos
 Designer: Omar Souto
 Hoy Como Ayer – Carajo
 Designer: Matias Marano
 El Lapsus del Jinete Ciego – Gabo Ferro
 Designer: Laura Varsky

Archival Concept
Best Archival Concept Album
 Jobim" – Silvina Garré and Litto Nebbia
 Executive producer: Litto Nebia
 Nuevas cartas al rey de la cabina y Anita, mi amor – Luis Pescetti and Juan Quintero
 Executive producer: Luis Pescetti
 Tiempo reflejado - Un homenaje a Manolo Juárez – Various Artists
 Executive producers: Mora Juárez and Lito Vitale

Multiple nominations and awards
The following received multiple nominations:

Five:
Abel Pintos
Three:
Carajo
Eruca Sativa
Illya Kuryaki and the Valderramas

Two
Benjamín Amadeo
Chango Spasiuk
Ciro y los Persas
Daniel Melingo
Eugenia Quevedo
Juan Quintero
La Barra
Lali
Los Fabulosos Cadillacs
Manal

References

2017 music awards